A New Kind of Horror is the tenth studio album by British extreme metal band Anaal Nathrakh. The album was released on 28 September 2018 through Metal Blade Records. The album has released two singles, “Forward!”, and “Obscene as Cancer”. The album is a follow-up to their 2016 album The Whole of the Law. The album's lyrics deal with the horrors of the First World War, contemporary politics, and the letters of D.H. Lawrence. Vocalist Dave Hunt stated:

Track listing
All tracks written by the band.

Personnel
Credits adapted from Metal Injection:

Mick Kenney – multi-instrumentalist 
Dave Hunt – vocals

References

2018 albums
Anaal Nathrakh albums
Metal Blade Records albums